Christmas bush may refer to:

Bursaria spinosa, a small tree or shrub that occurs in all Australian states 
Ceratopetalum gummiferum, a tall shrub from Australia also known as the New South Wales Christmas bush
Chromolaena odorata, a tropical species of shrub from the sunflower family
 Comocladia dodonaea, a poisonous shrub of Caribbean islands
 Metrosideros excelsa, New Zealand Christmas bush
 Metrosideros kermadecensis, New Zealand Christmas bush
Prostanthera lasianthos, a shrub from Australia also known as the Victorian Christmas bush
Senna bicapsularis, a legume species from northern South America

See also

 Bush Christmas
 Christmas berry
 Christmas plants
 O Christmas Bush
 Euphorbia leucocephala, called white Christmas bush
 Senna alata, called Christmas candles